Order (subtitled A Journal on the Theory of Ordered Sets and its Applications) is a quarterly peer-reviewed academic journal on order theory and its applications, published by Springer Science+Business Media. It was established in 1984 by Ivan Rival (University of Calgary). From 2010 to 2018, its editor-in-chief was Dwight Duffus (Emory University). He was succeeded in 2019 by Ryan R. Martin (Iowa State University).

Abstracting and indexing
The journal is abstracted and indexed in:

According to the Journal Citation Reports, the journal has a 2017 impact factor of 0.353.

References

External links

Order theory
Mathematics journals
Springer Science+Business Media academic journals
Publications established in 1984
English-language journals
Quarterly journals